Dear 23 is the second album by Seattle alternative rock/grunge/power pop band The Posies. The album was rereleased by Omnivore Recordings in 2018.

The first single was "Golden Blunders," which was later covered by Ringo Starr. "Apology" appears on Children of Nuggets: Original Artyfacts from the Second Psychedelic Era, 1976–1995.

Critical reception
The Chicago Tribune called Dear 23 "one of the year`s most engaging albums," writing that it delivers "a contemporary edge to the mid-`60s British Invasion sound of groups such as the Hollies." Entertainment Weekly wrote that group "avoids self- conscious revivalism with strong, intelligent songwriting and a solidly modern rock beat." Spin praised the "harmony-laden power pop sound." Paste wrote that "the sound, coaxed to life by English producer John Leckie, seemed to literally erupt from the speakers, brimming with hooks, harmonies and songs so captivating and effusive, repeated listens became all but mandatory."

Track listing 
All tracks by Jon Auer & Ken Stringfellow

Personnel 
The Posies
Jon Auer – vocals, guitars
Ken Stringfellow – vocals, guitars
Arthur "Rick" Roberts – bass
Mike Musburger – drums
Technical
Grant Alden – Typography
Jon Auer – Engineer, Assistant Engineer
Gary Gersh – Executive Producer
Fred Kelly – Assistant Engineer
John Leckie – Producer, Engineer, Mixing
Stephen Marcussen – Mastering
Karen Moskowitz – Photography
Arthur "Rick" Roberts – Cover Art Concept
Carl Smool – Set Design
Dennis R. White – Art Direction, Set Design

References

1990 albums
The Posies albums
Albums produced by John Leckie
Geffen Records albums